Denison Independent School District is a public school district based in Denison, Texas (USA).

In 2009, the school district was rated "Academically Acceptable" by the Texas Education Agency.

Schools

Current Schools
Denison High School (grades 9-12)
Pathways High School (alternative high school)
Henry Scott Middle School (grades 7–8)
Opened 2014
Formerly Denison High School (1950s-2014)
B. McDaniel Intermediate School (grades 5–6)
Formerly Hughes Junior High 
Formerly B. McDaniel Middle School (grades 6–8)
Houston Elementary School (PK-4)
Opened 1886
Hyde Park Elementary School (PK-4)
Lamar Elementary School (PK-4)
'''Mayes Elementary School (PK-4)
Terrell Elementary School (PK-4)
Opened 1927 as black-only high school
Closed 1968
Re-opened 1969 as integrated middle school

Former schools

Anderson School (1886-1939)
Burleson School (1888-??)
Central Ward Elementary School (1917-1979)
Golden Rule Elementary School (1915-2014)
Langston School (1874-1965)
First black school in Denison
Layne Elementary School (1879-2012)
McDaniel Junior High
Former Denison High School (1913-1950s)
Oak Grove School
Peabody School (??-1979)
Current DISD Administration Building
Raynal School (1891-1979)
Reasor School
Stevens School (1890-1927)
Walton School (??-1960's)
Washington School (1873-1913)
First free public school in Texas
'Wims School (1963-1979)

References

External links 
 

School districts in Grayson County, Texas